Agnostidae is a family of Agnostida trilobites. Like all Agnostina, they were eyeless and bore only two thoracic segments. They ranged in benthic waters across the globe from 508 to 461 million years ago, containing the following genera, among others:

Acmarhachis
Agnostus
Aistagnostus
Anglagnostus
Biciragnostus
Connagnostus
Distagnostus
Eolotagnostus
Gymnagnostus
Homagnostus
Idolagnostus
Innitagnostus
Ivshinagnostus
Kymagnostus
Lotagnostus
Micragnostus
Obelagnostus
Oncagnostus
Peronopsis
Phalacroma
Phalagnostus
Quadrahomagnostus
Raragnostus
Semagnostus
Strictagnostus
Trilobagnostus

References

 
Agnostoidea
Trilobite families
Cambrian first appearances
Middle Ordovician extinctions